Rishon LeZion railway station may refer to:
 Rishon LeZion HaRishonim railway station
 Rishon LeZion Moshe Dayan railway station